Robert Hassell (24 February 1929 – June 2004) was a British sports shooter. He competed at the 1960 Summer Olympics and the 1968 Summer Olympics.

References

External links
 

1929 births
2004 deaths
British male sport shooters
Olympic shooters of Great Britain
Shooters at the 1960 Summer Olympics
Shooters at the 1968 Summer Olympics
Sportspeople from London